Allochromatium humboldtianum is a Gram-negative and motile bacterium from the genus of Allochromatium which has been isolated from shallow water and coastal sediments from the coast of Callao in Peru.

References 

Chromatiales
Bacteria described in 2015